Aglaoctenus is a genus of wolf spiders first described by Albert Tullgren in 1905. , it contains only five species, all from South America.

References

Lycosidae
Araneomorphae genera
Spiders of South America